Cambodia competed in the 2008 Summer Olympics, held in Beijing, People's Republic of China from August 8 to August 24, 2008. The country sent a total of four competitors to the Games.

Athletics

Men

Women

Swimming

Men

Women

See also
 Cambodia at the 2008 Summer Paralympics

References

Nations at the 2008 Summer Olympics
2008
Olympics